Stefan Hundstrup (born 30 June 1986) is a Danish handballer, currently playing for Danish Handball League side Bjerringbro-Silkeborg. He joined the club from league rivals AG København in 2012.

During his youth career, Hundstrup made several appearances for the Danish national youth handball teams.

External links
 Player Info

1986 births
Living people
Danish male handball players
Viborg HK players
People from Svendborg
Sportspeople from the Region of Southern Denmark